The Spring 1945 offensive in Italy, codenamed Operation Grapeshot, was the final Allied attack during the Italian Campaign in the final stages of the Second World War. The attack into the Lombard Plain by the Allied 15th Army Group started on 6 April 1945 and ended on 2 May with the surrender of German forces in Italy.

Allied Forces Headquarters Mediterranean

Supreme Allied Commander, Mediterranean Theatre
Field Marshal Sir Harold Alexander
 Deputy: Lieutenant General Joseph T. McNarney
 Chief of Staff: Lieutenant-General William Morgan
 Air Commander-in Chief Mediterranean Allied Air Forces: Lieutenant General John K. Cannon

Allied 15th Army Group

General Mark Wayne Clark

Chief of Staff: Major General Alfred M. Gruenther

US Fifth Army

 
Lieutenant General Lucian K. Truscott

 Army troops
  85th Infantry "Custer" Division
 Major General John B. Coulter
 Infantry: 337th, 338th, 339th Infantry Regiments
 Artillery–105mm: 328th, 329th, 910th Field Artillery Battalions
 Artillery–155mm: 403rd Field Artillery Battalion
  92nd Infantry "Buffalo Soldiers" Division (Colored)
 Major General Edward M. Almond
 Infantry: 370th (Colored), 442nd (Nisei), 473rd Infantry Regiments
 Artillery–105mm: 597th, 598th, 599th, 600th Field Artillery Battalions (all Colored)
 Armor–Tank: 758th Light Tank Battalion, 760th Tank Battalion (less two companies)
 Armor–TD: 679th, 894th Tank Destroyer Battalion (less two companies)

Corps deployed west to east:

IV Corps

Lieutenant General Willis D. Crittenberger
 Corps troops
 365th Infantry Regiment
 371st Infantry Regiment
 751st Tank Battalion (plus one company 760th Tank Battalion)
 701st Tank Destroyer Battalion (plus elements 894th Tank Destroyer Battalion)
  1st Armored Division
 Major General Vernon Prichard
 Armor: 1st, 4th, 13th Tank Battalions
 Infantry: 6th, 11th, 14th Armored Infantry Battalions
 Artillery: 27th, 68th, 91st Armored Field Artillery Battalions
  10th Mountain Division
 Major General George Price Hays
 Infantry: 85th, 86th, 87th Infantry Regiments
 Artillery: 604th, 605th, 616th Field Artillery Battalions
 Armor: 10th Mountain Antitank Battalion
  Brazilian Expeditionary Force (FEB)
 General Mascarenhas de Morais
 1st Brazilian Infantry Regiment
 6th Brazilian Infantry Regiment
 11th Brazilian Infantry Regiment

II Corps

Major General Geoffrey Keyes
 Corps troops
  Combat Group "Legnano" (Italian Co-Belligerent Army)
 68th Infantry Regiment "Legnano"
 Special Infantry Regiment "Legnano"
 752nd, 757th Tank Battalions
 804th, 805th Tank Destroyer Battalions
  34th Infantry "Red Bull" Division
 Major General Charles L. Bolté
 Deputy: Brig. Gen. Harry B. Sherman
 Infantry: 133rd, 135th, 168th Infantry Regiments
 Artillery–105mm: 125th, 151st, 175th Field Artillery Battalions
 Artillery–155mm: 185th Field Artillery Battalion
  88th Infantry "Cloverleaf" Division
 Major General Paul W. Kendall
 Deputy: Brig. Gen. James C. Fry
 Infantry: 349th, 350th, 351st Infantry Regiments
 Artillery–105mm: 337th, 338th, 913th Field Artillery Battalions
 Artillery–155mm: 339th Field Artillery Battalion
  91st Infantry "Wild West" Division
 Major General William G. Livesay
 Deputy: Brig. Gen. Raymond E. S. Williamson
 Infantry: 361st, 362nd, 363rd Infantry Regiments
 Artillery–105mm: 346th, 347th, 916th Field Artillery Battalions
 Artillery–155mm: 348th Field Artillery Battalion
  6th South African Armoured Division
 Major-General Evered Poole
 11th South African Armoured Brigade
 12th South African Motorised Brigade
 13th South African Motorised Brigade

British Eighth Army

Lieutenant-General Sir Richard McCreery

 Army troops
 7th Hussars (amphibious tanks)
 12th Lancers (armoured cars)
 16th Army Group Royal Engineers
 20th Army Group Royal Engineers
 22nd Army Group Royal Engineers

V Corps

Lieutenant-General Charles Keightley
 Corps troops
 1st Army Group Royal Artillery (Five medium regiments)
 2nd Army Group Royal Artillery (Five medium regiments)
 6th Armoured Division Artillery
 54th Super Heavy Regiment, Royal Artillery (less two batteries)
 Special forces
 Two squadrons Special Boat Service
 Two troops Raiding Support Regiment
 28th Brigade "Garibaldi" (Italian partisans)
  56th Infantry Division
 Major-General John Yeldham Whitfield
 24th Guards Brigade
 167th Infantry Brigade
 169th Infantry Brigade
 2nd Commando Brigade (under command)
 9th Armoured Brigade (under command)
 27th Lancers (armoured cars) (under command)
 4th Hussars (Kangaroo armoured personnel carriers)
  78th Infantry Division
 Major-General Keith Arbuthnott 11th Infantry Brigade
 36th Infantry Brigade
 38th (Irish) Infantry Brigade
 2nd Armoured Brigade (under command)
  8th Indian Infantry Division Major-General Dudley Russell 17th Indian Infantry Brigade
 19th Indian Infantry Brigade
 21st Indian Infantry Brigade
 21st Army Tank Brigade (under command)
  2nd New Zealand Division Lieutenant-General Sir Bernard Freyberg, VC
 4th New Zealand Armoured Brigade
 5th New Zealand Infantry Brigade
 6th New Zealand Infantry Brigade
 9th New Zealand Infantry Brigade
  Combat Group "Cremona" (Italian Co-Belligerent Army) 
 Generale di Brigata Clemente Primieri 21st Infantry Regiment "Cremona"
 22nd Infantry Regiment "Cremona"

X Corps

Lieutenant-General John Hawkesworth Jewish Brigade (from March 1945)
 Palestine Regiment
  Combat Group "Friuli" (Italian Co-Belligerent Army)
 Generale di Brigata Arturo Scattini
 87th Infantry Regiment "Friuli"
 88th Infantry Regiment "Friuli"

XIII Corps

Lieutenant-General Sir John Harding 6th Army Group Royal Artillery (under command)
  Indian 10th Infantry Division Major-General Denys Reid 10th Indian Infantry Brigade
 20th Indian Infantry Brigade
 25th Indian Infantry Brigade
 Lovat Scouts (under command)
 2nd Battalion, Highland Light Infantry (under command)
  Combat Group "Folgore" (Italian Co-Belligerent Army) 
 Generale di Brigata Giorgio Morigi
 Paratroopers Regiment "Nembo"
 Navy Regiment "San Marco"

Polish II Corps

Major-General Zygmunt Bohusz-Szyszko (acting commander)
 Corps troops Army Group Polish Artillery
 54th Super Heavy Regiment Royal Artillery (one battery)
 British 7th Armoured Brigade (under command)
 43rd Gurkha Lorried Infantry Brigade (under command)
 14th/20th Hussars (Kangaroo armoured personnel carriers) (under command)
  3rd Carpathian Rifle Division Major-General Bolesław Bronisław Duch 1st Carpathian Rifle Brigade
 2nd Carpathian Rifle Brigade
 3rd Carpathian Rifle Brigade
  5th Kresowa Infantry Division Major-General Nikodem Sulik 5th Wilenska Infantry Brigade
 6th Lwowska Infantry Brigade
 4th Wolwyn Infantry Brigade
 2nd Armoured Brigade (Brigadier-General Bronislaw Rakowski)

Army Reserve
  6th Armoured Division Major-General Horatius Murray 26th Armoured Brigade
 1st Guards Brigade
 61st Infantry Brigade
 25th Armoured Engineer Brigade (less detachments with assault divisions)
 2nd Parachute Brigade

 Axis forces in Italy 

 Army Group C 

Generaloberst Heinrich von Vietinghoff (to 29 April)
General der Infanterie Friedrich Schulz (from 29 April to 2 May)
Generaloberst Heinrich von Vietinghoff (from 2 May)

West: Army Group Liguria 

Marshal Rodolfo Graziani Corps Lombardia Lieutenant-General Kurt Jahn 3rd Marine Infantry Division "San Marco" (Major-General Amilcare Farina)
 Battle Group Meinhold
 Fortress Brigade 135
 Elements of the 4th Alpine Division "Monterosa"

 LXXV Corps General der Gebirgstruppe Hans Schlemmer 2nd Grenadier Division "Littorio" (Major-General Tito Agosti)
 4th Alpine Division "Monterosa" (bulk of) (Colonel Giorgio Milazzo)
 5th Mountain Division (Generalmajor Hans Steets)
 34th Infantry Division (Generalleutnant Theobald Lieb)

 Center: Fourteenth Army

Generalleutnant Joachim Lemelsen XIV Panzer Corps Generalleutnant Frido von Senger und Etterlin 8th Mountain Division (Major-General Paul Schricker)
 65th Infantry Division (Major-General Hellmuth Pfeifer)
 94th Infantry Division (Major-General Bernhard Steinmetz)

 LI Mountain Corps Generalleutnant Valentin Feurstein until March 1945 and then Lieutenant-General Friedrich-Wilhelm Hauck 1st Bersaglieri Division "Italia" (Major-General Mario Carloni)
 114th Jäger Division (Brigadier-General Hans-Joachim Ehlert to 15 April 1945 then Brigadier-General Martin Strahammer)
 148th Reserve Division (Major-General Otto Fretter-Pico)
 232nd Infantry Division (Major-General Eccard Freiherr von Gablenz)
 334th Infantry Division (Major-General Hellmuth Böhlke)

 East: Tenth Army 

Generalleutnant Traugott Herr LXXVI Panzer Corps Lieutenant-General Graff Gerhard von Schwerin (to 25 April 1945)
 Major-General Karl von Graffen (from 25 April 1945)
 42nd Jäger Division (Major-General Walter Jost)
 98th Infantry Division (Major-General Alfred-Hermann Reinhardt to 11 April 1945 then Brigadier-General Otto Schiel)
 162nd Turkoman Division (Major-General Ralph von Heygendorff)
 362nd Infantry Division (Brigadier-General Alois Weber)

 I Parachute Corps Lieutenant-General Richard Heidrich 1st Parachute Division (Brigadier-General Karl-Lothar Schulz)
 4th Parachute Division (Major-General Heinrich Trettner)
 26th Panzer Division (Brigadier-General Alfred Kuhnert to 19 April 1945 then Major-General Viktor Linnarz)
 278th Infantry Division (Major-General Harry Hoppe)
 including the 1st Italian Assault Company "Forlì" (Pier Vittorio Riccardi)
 305th Infantry Division (Brigadier-General Friedrich von Schellwitz)

 LXXIII Corps Lieutenant-General Anton Dostler Minor units watching the coast between the Po and Venice

 LXXXXVII Corps (transferred to Army Group E in Yugoslavia on 10 April)
 General of the Mountain Troops Ludwig Kübler
 188th Mountain Division (Major-General Hans von Hößlin)
 237th Infantry Division (Major-General Hans von Grävenitz until late April then Colonel Karl Falkner)

 Army Reserve
 29th Panzergrenadier Division (Major-General Fritz Polack)
 155th Infantry Division (Brigadier-General Georg Zwade)

Army Group Reserve
 90th Panzergrenadier Division (Brigadier-General Heinrich Baron von Behr)

Notes

References

Sources

Print

Web
 
 
 

World War II orders of battle
Italian campaign (World War II)